The St. Louis Car Company "Doodlebug" was a model of lightweight, streamlined Diesel-electric railcars built by the St. Louis Car Company in 1936 for the Seaboard Air Line Railroad. The units had a B-2 wheel arrangement, mounted atop a pair of road trucks. The aft section was divided into two separate compartments: one was used to transport baggage and the other served as a small railway post office, or RPO (the forward door, located just behind the radiator louvers, was equipped with a mail hook).

Two units were manufactured for the Seaboard Air Line Railroad (SAL) and were numbered 2027 and 2028. Unit 2027 was destroyed in a collision with a gas tanker truck at Arcadia, Florida in 1956. Unit 2028 remained in service, and was primarily used on the Silver Meteor between Tampa, Florida and Venice, Florida through the 1950s and 60s. Unit 2028 was renumbered to 4900 after the Seaboard Coast Line merger in 1967 between the SAL and the Atlantic Coast Line Railroad (ACL). Unit 2028, now numbered 4900, was reassigned to operate the Champion between Lakeland, Florida and Naples, Florida. Unit 2028 was removed from service and scrapped after Amtrak took over national passenger service in 1971.

See also
 List of GM-EMD locomotives
 Doodlebug (rail car)
 FM OP800, similar St. Louis Car Company built railcars, powered by Fairbanks-Morse

References

External links

B-2 locomotives
Electro-Motive Division locomotives
North American streamliner trains
Scrapped locomotives
Passenger locomotives
Diesel-electric locomotives of the United States
Standard gauge locomotives of the United States

Streamlined diesel locomotives